The Micro-Professor MPF-I, introduced in 1981 by Multitech (which, in 1987, changed its name to Acer), was the first branded computer product from Multitech and probably one of the world's longest selling computers. The MPF-I, specifically designed to teach the fundamentals of machine code and assembly language, is a simple and easy to use training system for the Zilog Z80 microprocessor.

The MPF-I does not look like a typical Microcomputer. It is enclosed in a vacuum formed plastic book case often used to store a copy of a language textbook, two audio cassettes, and a training manual. When closed, the MPF-I can be placed on a bookshelf for easy storage and looks just like a book or a file. This form factor made the computer more appealing to the buyers, since it could be stored away with ease, and it could blend in with the office or home.

Programs are entered into the MPF-I using Z80 machine code in hexadecimal format. The MPF-I monitor program displays both an address and data stored at that address simultaneously using a seven-segment display. There is a spare DIP socket for adding additional ROM or RAM to the MPF-I. There are also two 3.5mm audio jacks on the top right of the computer, these are to communicate with the audio cassettes that are used to store programs and code typed into the machine. One is used to read the drive and the other is used to write data; on a conventional audio cassette deck the wires would be connected to the headphone and microphone ports. This type of data storage is similar to that of a Radio Shack TRS-80 or the Sinclair ZX-81, which similarly used audio cassettes to store programs the user typed, as well as commercial programs and games the user could buy.

Later Multitech introduced a Tiny-Basic for the MPF-1. The Monitor and Basic fitted into one 4 kByte ROM, replacing the 2 kByte monitor-only ROM. This configuration was marketed as the MPF-1B.

In 1984 Multitech introduced the MPF-1P or MPF-Plus, an evolution of the MPF-1 as it had the same form factor. It featured a single line 20-digit, 14-segment fluorescent display and a click-type QWERTY keyboard. It had the same expansion connector as the MPF-1 (strictly a Z80-CPU pin-header), so several of the MPF-1 expansion boards could be used on the MPF-1P. It was more a Basic computer than the MPF-1, with an assembler and disassembler as  part of the firmware (8Kbyte). The MPF-1P featured 4 kByte static RAM, with optional battery backup.

1985 saw the release of the MPF-I/88, the latest in the MPF-I line. It was an Intel 8088 based single board computer with a two-line LCD screen.

On 24 February 1993, Flite Electronics International Limited in Southampton, England, at that time an international distributor for Acer, purchased the copyright to the MPF-I's training manuals, as well as its firmware and hardware intellectual property rights from Acer. Flite is still manufacturing small batches of the MPF1B at a sub-contract manufacturing facility in Havant England

See also 
 Microprofessor II — an unrelated Apple II clone also made by Multitech
 Microprofessor III — another unrelated Apple IIe clone made by Multitech

References

External links 
 
Flite Electronics – International Supplier of  Microprocessor Training Systems and owner of the overall copyright of the MPF range of products
A tribute to the Microprofessor System
 MPF-I User's manual
 PDF documentation and ROM dumps for the Multitech MPF-1 computer
 Acer MPF-1 in Runaway, Starring the Computer
  June 2021 Elektor interview with Flite and latest news 

Acer Inc. computers
Early microcomputers
Z80-based home computers
Z80